Diadegma albotibiale is a wasp first described by Horstmann in 1973. No subspecies are listed.

References

albotibiale
Insects described in 1973